Jatiyatabadi Samajik Sangskritik Sangstha, also known as JASAS, is the cultural of wing of Bangladesh Nationalist Party.

History 
Jatiyatabadi Samajik Sangskritik Sangstha was established in 1978.

In February 2015, Bangladesh police arrested Singer and JASAS leader, Baby Naznin, near the political office of former Prime Minister Khaleda Zia. The joint general secretary of Zakiganj Upazila unit of JASAS, Sultan Ahmed, went missing in January 2018. A police missing case was filed with the Zakiganj Police Station.

In 2018, Jatiyatabadi Samajik Sangskritik Sangstha carried out a signature collection drive to demand the release of former Prime Minister and Chairperson of Bangladesh Nationalist Party Khaleda Zia. In April 2018 a conversation was leaked between the vice chairperson of the party and son of Khaleda Zia, Tarique Rahman and Mamun Ahmed, Professor of the Biochemistry department of the University of Dhaka and leader of JASAS. In the audio, Tarique Rahman, who is in exile in the United Kingdom, was instructing Mamun to encourage pro-Bangladesh Nationalist Party academics to join and support the 2018 Bangladesh quota reform movement.

On 23 November 2019, Bangladesh Nationalist Party approved 184 member committee of the organisation. On 21 February 2021 at a program organised by JASAS Bangladesh Nationalist Party secretary general Mirza Fakhrul Islam Alamgir called Bangladesh a one party state.

References 

1978 establishments in Bangladesh
Organisations based in Dhaka
Bangladesh Nationalist Party